Greenockite is a rare cadmium bearing metal sulfide mineral  consisting of cadmium sulfide (CdS) in crystalline form. Greenockite crystallizes in the hexagonal system. It occurs as massive encrustations and as hemimorphic six-sided pyramidal crystals which vary in color from a honey yellow through shades of red to brown. The Mohs hardness is 3 to 3.5 and the specific gravity is 4.8 to 4.9.

Greenockite belongs to the wurtzite group  and is isostructural with it at high temperatures. It is also isostructural with sphalerite at low temperatures. It occurs with other sulfide minerals such as sphalerite and galena, and is the only ore mineral of cadmium. Most cadmium is recovered as a byproduct of copper, zinc, and lead mining. It is also known from the lead-zinc districts of the central United States.

It was first recognized in 1840 in Bishopton, Scotland, during the cutting of a tunnel for the Glasgow, Paisley and Greenock Railway. The mineral was named after the land owner Lord Greenock (1783–1859).

Use
Greenockite, also known as "cadmium ochre", was used as a yellow pigment prior to cadmium being recognized as a toxic element. The extracted cadmium has various industrial use, such as electrical nickel-cadmium (NiCd) rechargeable batteries, electroplating, high temp alloys, plating steel and other metals that corrode easily, and use in control rods for some nuclear reactors.

References

Mineral galleries

External links

Cadmium minerals
Sulfide minerals
Renfrewshire
Hexagonal minerals
Minerals in space group 186